Argentina competed at the 1964 Summer Olympics in Tokyo, Japan. 102 competitors, 96 men and 6 women, took part in 78 events in 14 sports.

Medalists

Athletics

Boxing

Cycling

Ten cyclists represented Argentina in 1964.

Individual road race
 Delmo Delmastro
 Roberto Breppe
 Rubén Placanica

Team time trial
 Héctor Acosta
 Roberto Breppe
 Delmo Delmastro
 Rubén Placanica

Sprint
 Oscar García
 Carlos Alberto Vázquez

1000m time trial
 Carlos Alberto Vázquez

Team pursuit
 Carlos Alberto Álvarez
 Ernesto Contreras
 Juan Alberto Merlos
 Alberto Trillo

Equestrian

Fencing

Eleven fencers, ten men and one woman, represented Argentina in 1964.

Men's foil
 Orlando Nannini
 Jesús Taboada
 Adolfo Bisellach

Men's team foil
 Adolfo Bisellach, Jesús Taboada, Alberto Lanteri, Orlando Nannini, Félix Galimi

Men's épée
 Zelmar Casco
 Francisco Serp
 Jesús Taboada

Men's team épée
 Félix Galimi, Zelmar Casco, Jesús Taboada, Francisco Serp

Men's sabre
 Alberto Lanteri
 Rafael González
 Juan Carlos Frecia

Men's team sabre
 Rafael González, Juan Carlos Frecia, Julian Velásquez, Alberto Lanteri

Women's foil
 María Romano

Football

Gymnastics

Judo

Rowing

Sailing

Open

Shooting

Eight shooters represented Argentina in 1964.

25 m pistol
 Manuel José Fernández
 Juan Carlos Oxoby

50 m pistol
 Humberto Aspitia

50 m rifle, three positions
 Eduardo Armella

50 m rifle, prone
 Melchor López
 Cirilo Nassiff

Trap
 Juan Ángel Martini, Sr.
 José Passera

Swimming

Weightlifting

Wrestling

References

Nations at the 1964 Summer Olympics
1964
1964 in Argentine sport